Tuğçe Hocaoğlu (born March 11, 1988 in Bursa, Turkey) is a Turkish female volleyball player. She plays for Vakıfbank Spor Kulübü and wears the number 9.

Clubs
 VakıfBank Güneş Sigorta Türk Telekom (2010– )

Awards

Clubs
 2012–13 Turkish Cup -  Champion, with Vakıfbank Spor Kulübü
 2012–13 CEV Champions League -  Champion, with Vakıfbank Spor Kulübü
 2012–13 Turkish Women's Volleyball League -  Champion, with Vakıfbank Spor Kulübü

See also
 Turkish women in sports

References

1988 births
Living people
Turkish women's volleyball players
VakıfBank S.K. volleyballers
Sportspeople from Bursa
Yeşilyurt volleyballers